462 Eriphyla  (prov. designation:  or ) is a Koronian asteroid from the outer regions of the asteroid belt. It was discovered by German astronomer Max Wolf at the Heidelberg-Königstuhl State Observatory on 22 October 1900. It was named after Eriphyle, from Greek mythology.

Orbit and classification 

Eriphyla is a core member of the Koronis family, a very large outer asteroid family with nearly co-planar ecliptical orbits. It orbits the Sun in the outer asteroid belt at a distance of 2.6–3.1 AU once every 4 years and 10 months (1,777 days; semi-major axis of 2.87 AU). Its orbit has an eccentricity of 0.09 and an inclination of 3° with respect to the ecliptic. The body's observation arc begins at Heidelberg on 11 November 1900, three weeks after its official discovery observation.

Naming 

This minor planet was named from Greek mythology after Eriphyle, wife of Amphiaraus whom she persuaded to take part in a raiding venture which lead to the tragic war of the Seven against Thebes. The  was also mentioned in The Names of the Minor Planets by Paul Herget in 1955.

Physical characteristics 

In both the Tholen and SMASS classification, Eriphyla is a common stony S-type asteroid.

Rotation period 

In October 2002, a rotational lightcurve of Eriphyla was obtained from photometric observations by Stephen M. Slivan. Lightcurve analysis gave a well-defined rotation period of  hours with a brightness variation of  magnitude. Several more lightcurves were published since 1987.

A modeled lightcurve using photometric data from the Lowell Photometric Database and from the Wide-field Infrared Survey Explorer (WISE) was published in 2018. It gave a concurring sidereal period of  hours and includes two spin axes at (119.0°, 7.0°) and (301.0°, 5.0°) in ecliptic coordinates (λ, β).

Diameter and albedo 

According to the surveys carried out by the Infrared Astronomical Satellite IRAS, the Japanese Akari satellite and the NEOWISE mission of NASA's WISE telescope, Eriphyla measures between 34.274 and 41.882 kilometers in diameter and its surface has an albedo between 0.1746 and 0.2829. The Collaborative Asteroid Lightcurve Link assumes an albedo of 0.2438 and derives a diameter of 35.32 kilometers based on an absolute magnitude of 9.41.

References

External links 
 Lightcurve Database Query (LCDB), at www.minorplanet.info
 Dictionary of Minor Planet Names, Google books
 Asteroids and comets rotation curves, CdR – Geneva Observatory, Raoul Behrend
 Discovery Circumstances: Numbered Minor Planets (1)-(5000) – Minor Planet Center
 
 

Koronis asteroids
Eriphyla
Eriphyla
S-type asteroids (Tholen)
S-type asteroids (SMASS)
19001022